The International Racquetball Federation's 17th Racquetball World Championships were held in Burlington, Ontario, Canada, from June 14 to 21, 2014. This was the second time Worlds were in Canada. Previously, they were in Montreal in 1992.

In men's singles, American Rocky Carson was the three-time defending champion, and he won gold for a fourth time, which made him the most decorated men's racquetball player at the World Championships. In capturing the gold, Carson won all of his matches in two straight games.

Conrrado Moscoso of Bolivia was the surprise silver medalist. Moscoso defeated the 2012 silver medalist Polo Gutierrez of Mexico in the quarterfinals and the beat fellow Bolivian Carlos Keller in the semi-finals to reach the final.

The other semi-final was between two Americans: Carson and  Jose Rojas. The Americans were on the same side of the draw, because Rojas lost to Fernando Rios of Ecuador in a great match that went tie-breaker in the round robin part of the competition.  Sadly for Rios, his victory didn't lead to a great position in the elimination draw, as he had to play Gutierrez in the second round, as Gutierrez missed one of his round robin matches, which put him fourth in his group. Gutierrez defeated Rios in two games.

Mexican Alvaro Beltran was the other former World Champion in the men's draw (Beltran won the title in 2000), but he lost early in the elimination round as a result of a forfeit to Jose Daniel Ugalde of Ecuador.

Tournament format
The 2014 World Championships was the first competition with an initial round robin stage that was used to seed players for an elimination qualification round. Previously, players were seeded into an elimination round based on how their countries had done at previous World Championships, and then a second team competition was also played.

Round robin

Pool A

Pool B

Pool C

Pool D

Pool E

Pool F

Pool G

Pool H

Pool I

Pool J

Elimination round

References

2014 Racquetball World Championships